Semyon Zinovyevich Alapin (– 15 July 1923) was a Russian chess player, openings analyst, and puzzle composer. He was also a linguist, railway engineer and a grain commodities merchant.

Biography
He was one of the strongest chess players in the Russian Empire in the late 19th century. He died in Heidelberg, Germany, on 15 July 1923.

Legacy
Today he is best known for his creation of opening systems in almost all major openings. Most of these are of little significance today, but Alapin's Variation of the Sicilian Defence is an important opening line that is often played by leading grandmasters.

List of openings named after Alapin

Alapin's Variation of the Sicilian Defence: 1. e4 c5 2. c3
Alapin's Opening in the Open Game: 1. e4 e5 2. Ne2!?
Alapin's Gambit of the French Defence: 1. e4 e6 2. d4 d5 3. Be3!?
Alapin's Defence of the Ruy Lopez: 1. e4 e5 2. Nf3 Nc6 3. Bb5 Bb4
Alapin's Variation of the Caro-Kann Defence: 1. e4 c6 2. c3
Alapin's Variation of the Dutch Defence (also known as the "Manhattan Variation"): 1. d4 f5 2. Qd3
Alapin's Variation of the Queen's Gambit: 1. d4 d5 2. c4 e6 3. Nc3 b6
Alapin–Steinitz Variation of the Evans Gambit: 1. e4 e5 2. Nf3 Nc6 3. Bc4 Bc5 4. b4 Bxb4 5. c3 Ba5 6. 0-0 d6 7. d4 Bg4
Sanders–Alapin Variation of the Evans Gambit: 1. e4 e5 2. Nf3 Nc6 3. Bc4 Bc5 4. b4 Bxb4 5. c3 Ba5 6. 0-0 d6 7. d4 Bd7

See also
 List of Russian chess players

References

External links 
 

1856 births
1923 deaths
Chess players from the Russian Empire
Chess theoreticians
Chess composers
Jewish chess players
Sportspeople from Saint Petersburg
19th-century chess players
Emigrants from the Russian Empire to the German Empire